Champanges is a commune in the Haute-Savoie department in the Auvergne-Rhône-Alpes region in south-eastern France. An Alpine community, with a tourist and camping industry, it is close to Lake Leman and the French-Swiss border.

See also
Communes of the Haute-Savoie department

References

Communes of Haute-Savoie